This article has details on 1. FC Köln statistics.

Recent seasons

By season

By competition

In European football

By season

Key

Pld = Matches played
W = Matches won
D = Matches drawn
L = Matches lost
GF = Goals for
GA = Goals against
GD = Goal difference
Grp = Group stage
GS2 = Second group stage

R1 = First round
R2 = Second round
R3 = Third round
R4 = Fourth round
R16 = Round of 16
QF = Quarter-final
SF = Semi-final

Key to colours and symbols:

By competition

Honours

 German Champions
 Winners (3): 1961–62, 1963–64, 1977–78
Runners-up (7): 1959–60, 1962–63, 1964–65, 1972–73, 1981–82, 1988–89, 1989–90
 2. Bundesliga
 Winners (4): 1999–2000, 2004–05, 2013–14, 2018–19
Runners-up (1): 2002–03
 DFB-Pokal
Winners (4): 1967–68, 1976–77, 1977–78, 1982–83
Runners-up (6): 1953–54, 1969–70, 1970–71, 1972–73, 1979–80, 1990–91
 UEFA Europa League / UEFA Cup
Runners-up (1): 1985–86

Regional
 Oberliga West
Winners (5): 1953–54, 1959–60, 1960–61, 1961–62, 1962–63
Runners-up (3): 1952–53, 1957–58, 1958–59

Doubles
1977–78: League and DFB-Pokal

Reserve team
 German amateur champions: 1981

Youth
 German Under 19 championship
 Champions: 1970–71
 Runners-up: 1973–74, 1982–83, 1991–92
 Under 19 Bundesliga Division West
 Champions: 2007–08
 Runners-up: 2003–04, 2009–10, 2013–14, 2014–15
 Under 19 Juniors DFB-Pokal
 Champions: 2012–13
 Runners-up: 1990–91, 1993–94
 German Under 17 championship
 Champions: 1989–90, 2010–11, 2018–19
 Under 17 Bundesliga Division West
 Champions: 2010–11, 2011–12
 Runners-up: 2008–09, 2018–19

Club records

Record wins
Home
 13–0 against Union Luxembourg, 5 October 1965 (Inter-Cities Fairs Cup)
 9–1 against Viking FK, 7 November 1972 (UEFA Cup)
 8–0 against Tottenham Hotspur, 22 July 1995 (Intertoto Cup)
 8–0 against Schalke 04, 8 November 1969 (League)
 8–0 against Eintracht Braunschweig, 8 September 1979 (League)
 8–1 against Dynamo Dresden, 10 November 2018 (League)
 7–0 against Schalke 04, 9 September 1967 (League)
 7–0 against Eintracht Frankfurt, 29 October 1983 (League)
 7–1 against Tennis Borussia Berlin, 31 May 1975 (League)
 7–1 against Werder Bremen, 21 January 2023 (League)

Away
 9–1 against BFC Dynamo, 19 August 2018 (Cup)
 6–0 against SC Tasmania 1900 Berlin, 30 October 1965 (League)
 6–0 against VSG Altglienicke, 12 September 2020 (Cup)
 5–0 against FC St. Pauli, 29 April 1978 (League)
 5–0 against Werder Bremen, 24 May 1980 (League)
 5–0 against Hertha BSC, 22 February 2020 (League)
 4–0 against Barcelona, 5 November 1980 (UEFA Cup)

Record defeats
Home
 1–6 against Borussia Dortmund, 23 August 1994 (League)
 1–6 against VfB Stuttgart, 1 June 1991 (League)
 1–6 against Borussia Dortmund, 25 March 2012 (League)
 1–3 against Inter Milan, 20 March 1985 (UEFA Cup) (heaviest home defeat in European football)

Away
 1–8 against Dundee, 5 September 1962 (European Cup) (heaviest away defeat in European football)
 0–7 against Bayern Munich, 15 May 1971 (League)
 0–6 against VfL Wolfsburg, 21 October 2000 (League)
 0–6 against 1899 Hoffenheim, 31 March 2018 (League)

Goalscorers
Most goals in a single match: Dieter Müller, 6 goals (against Werder Bremen, 17 August 1977)
Youngest goalscorer: Pierre Littbarski, 18 years, 4 months and 24 days (against Fortuna Düsseldorf, League, 9 September 1978)
Oldest goalscorer: Morten Olsen, 39 years, 6 months and 18 days (against VfL Bochum, 4 March 1989)

All-time Bundesliga table
1. FC Köln led the standings since the inception of the Bundesliga in 1963 (except of matchday 4 in the very same season).
In the 1983–84 Bundesliga season the FC Bayern Munich took the lead from 1. FC Köln.
Currently 1. FC Köln is ranked in ninth place in the all-time Bundesliga table.

All-time Oberliga West table
The Oberliga West was the highest level of the German football league system in the west of Germany from 1947 until the formation of the Bundesliga in 1963. With the reintroduction of the German championship in 1948, the winner and runners-up of the Oberliga West went on to the finals tournament with the other five Oberliga champions.  1. FC Köln is on 2nd place in the All-time Oberliga West table.

Bundesliga records (incomplete)

Exclusive
Scoring in every game of the season (30 games): 1963–64 Bundesliga
Highest number of scored goals in a game by a single player: 6 by Dieter Müller (matchday 3 of 1977–78 Bundesliga)
Highest number of goalless draws in a season: 9 (2014–15 Bundesliga)
Highest number of consecutive games with a clean sheet by a goalkeeper from debut: 4 by Timo Horn (matchday 1 to 4 of 2014–15 Bundesliga)
Highest number of consecutive minutes without conceding by a goalkeeper from debut: 365 by Timo Horn (minute 1 of matchday 1 to minute 6 of matchday 5 of 2014–15 Bundesliga)
Highest number of consecutive games without scoring: 10 (matchday 15 to 24 of 2001–02 Bundesliga)
Highest number of consecutive minutes without scoring: 1,033 (from minute 31 of matchday 14 to minute 74 of matchday 25 of 2001–02 Bundesliga)

Split
Highest number of consecutive games with a clean sheet away: 6 (matchday 6 to 16 of 2009–10 Bundesliga)
Lowest number of losses in a season at home (34 games): 0 (1972–73 Bundesliga and 1987–88 Bundesliga)
Highest number of goals in a game: 1. FC Köln 8–4 Tennis Borussia Berlin (1976–77 Bundesliga)
Highest number of viewers in a game: 88.075 Hertha BSC against 1. FC Köln (matchday 6 of 1969–70 Bundesliga)

References

External links 
 1.FC Köln on fussballdaten.de (German)
 1.FC Köln Official website (English)

German football club statistics